Kampong Peninjau, also known as Kampong Jerudong 'B', is a village in Brunei-Muara District, Brunei. The population was 3,418 in 2016. It is one of the villages within Mukim Sengkurong. The postcode is BG3522.

References 

Peninjau